The Virgen Dam is an embankment dam on the Viejo River near the town of El Hato de La Virgen in Matagalpa Department, Nicaragua. The primary purpose of the dam is hydroelectric power generation and it supports the  run-of-the-river Carlos Fonesca (Santa Barbara) Plant. The dam and power station were completed in 1972. The plant contains two  Francis turbine-generators.

In 1998 heavy rains and flooding from Hurricane Mitch severely damaged the Mancotal and El Dorado Dams, over-topping their spillways and nearly destroying the dams. The Virgen Dam was destroyed but later rebuilt.

References

Dams completed in 1972
Energy infrastructure completed in 1972
Dams in Nicaragua
Hydroelectric power stations in Nicaragua
Matagalpa Department
Run-of-the-river power stations
Dam failures in North America
1988 disasters in North America
Man-made disasters in Nicaragua